Nimmakayala Chinarajappa is an Indian politician from Andhra Pradesh. He is the present MLA of Telugu Desam Party, representing Peddapuram assembly constituency of the Andhra Pradesh Legislative Assembly.

Personal life and education 
Nimmakayala Chinna Rajappa is a resident of vijayawada in East of Andhra Pradesh. He completed his post-graduation in Master of Arts.

Political career
Nimmakayala Chinna Rajappa worked as the district president of Telugu Desam Party for two decades. He was also a Member of Legislative Council. He won the 2014 Andhra Pradesh Legislative Assembly election by defeating Thota Subbarao Naidu of YSR Congress Party, with a margin of over 10000 votes.

References 

State cabinet ministers of Andhra Pradesh
Telugu Desam Party politicians
People from East Godavari district
Third N. Chandrababu Naidu Cabinet (2014–2019)
Deputy Chief Ministers of Andhra Pradesh
Home Ministers of Andhra Pradesh
Telugu politicians
1953 births
Living people
Andhra Pradesh MLAs 2019–2024